10th District Court is a 2004 documentary film from France, directed by Raymond Depardon.

Synopsis
The proceedings of a Paris courtroom are the grist for this documentary. Drawn from over 200 appearances before the same female judge, the director chooses a dozen or so varied misdemeanor and civil hearings to highlight the subtle details of human behaviour. In the process he draws attention to issues of guilt, innocence, policing and ethnicity in France.

Reception
The Guardian's Mark Kermode judged 10th District Court showed a "gallery" of personalities which was "fascinating". His colleague Peter Bradshaw considered the film a "superb documentary".

References

External links

2000s French-language films
Documentary films about law
French documentary films
2004 films
2004 documentary films
Law of France
Documentary films about Paris
2000s French films